Nagia sthenistica is a species of moth in the family Erebidae. It is found in Australia, where it has been recorded from Western Australia.

References

Nagia
Moths described in 1926
Moths of Australia